St Gabriel's Hurling Club is a Gaelic Athletic Association club located in Wembley, London, England. The club was founded in 1961 and is exclusively concerned with the game of hurling.

Honours
 London Senior Hurling Championship (18): 1965, 1973, 1974, 1976, 1977, 1978, 1981, 1986, 1990, 1995, 1996, 1997, 1999, 2009, 2012, 2013, 2018, 2022
 London Intermediate Hurling Championship (10): 1968, 1973, 1978, 1985, 1986, 1988, 1990, 1991, 2013, 2015
 London Junior Hurling Championship (2): 1961, 1981
 All-Ireland Intermediate Club Hurling Championship runner-up 2013

References

External links
St Gabriel's Hurling Club official website

Gaelic Athletic Association clubs in London
Hurling clubs in London GAA
Sport in the London Borough of Brent